Dark Jovian is an EP by Brazilian electronic musician Amon Tobin. A teaser video was posted of a one-minute snippet of 'Dark Jovian' on April 10, 2015. It was released on April 18, 2015 through Ninja Tune Records as a Record Store Day exclusive. Due to a shipping delay, release in North America was postponed to May 5, 2015.

Album

Concept
The EP was inspired, according to Tobin, by science fiction space exploration films and the works of composers John Williams, Jerry Goldsmith, and György Ligeti.

Tobin describes the creation process:

Packaging
As part of Record Store day, it will be released on two singled sided heavyweight 180g with etched markings, encased in a white, branded, rubber wheel and housed in a transparent plastic box designed by Alexander Brown. The physical product was also inspired by the golden discs launched with both Voyager spacecraft in the 1977. However, due to shipping delay by UPS, the release date of Dark Jovian was pushed back to May 5 in North America so it will no longer be available to purchase in stores on Record Store day.

Track listing

References

Amon Tobin albums
Ninja Tune EPs
2015 EPs